Drechslera dematioidea is a plant pathogen.

References

Fungal plant pathogens and diseases
Pleosporaceae